Ward's Science is a supplier of science education materials for K-12 and college-level studies in Rochester, New York. It was founded by Henry Augustus Ward in 1862 as Ward's Natural Science and was renamed in 2012.

Current areas of focus include: geology, earth science, biology, chemistry, environmental science, forensic science, and physical science.

Ward's Science and its affiliates, Boreal Science and Sargent-Welch, provide science education materials for elementary through college classrooms.

External links
Ward's Science
Ward's Science History
Ward's World (Free resources for science teachers, from Ward's Science)

References

Companies based in Rochester, New York
Science education in the United States
1862 establishments in New York (state)
Companies established in 1862